H. minuta  may refer to:
 Hauffenia minuta, a minute freshwater snail species found in France and Switzerland
 Helicoverpa minuta, the minute noctuid moth, an extinct moth species endemic to the United States

See also
 Minuta